Gianfranco Dettori (born 25 April 1941) is an Italian retired Thoroughbred horse racing jockey.

Dettori was born in Serramanna, in what is now the Province of South Sardinia. During his career, he won an Italian riding championship thirteen times. In addition to winning many major races in Italy, Dettori won in Great Britain as well, capturing such races as the Classic 2,000 Guineas in 1975 and 1976, plus the  Benson & Hedges Gold Cup and Eclipse Stakes in 1976.

He is the father of jockey Frankie Dettori.

References
 Profile of Gianfranco Dettori at the Serramanna commune website (Italian language)

1941 births
Living people
People from the Province of South Sardinia
Italian jockeys
Sportspeople from Sardinia